Yngve Koehler Raustein (17 October 1970 – 18 September 1992) was a Norwegian undergraduate student at the Massachusetts Institute of Technology (MIT) in Cambridge, Massachusetts and a resident of Baker House. On the evening of 18 September 1992 he was walking down Memorial Drive by Hayden Library when he and his companion were attacked by three students of Cambridge Rindge and Latin High School. Shon McHugh (aged 15), Joseph D. Donovan (aged 17), and Alfredo Velez (aged 18) robbed Raustein and his companion of $33, and McHugh stabbed Raustein, causing fatal injuries. MIT President Charles M. Vest issued a statement the next day. A memorial service for Raustein was held on 9 October 1992.

Raustein's murder was the first of an MIT student for over a decade and sparked a Town and gown debate centering on the tension between the wealthy universities in Cambridge, MIT and Harvard University, and the poorer permanent Cambridge population. A vigil held the week after his death drew representatives from both communities. A permanent memorial award, the Yngve Raustein Award for Scholarship, Teamwork and Community, was established at MIT in 1993. Raustein has been memorialized in the Garden of Peace memorial in Boston, Massachusetts.

McHugh was tried as a juvenile, and was released from prison after less than 11 years. Velez testified against Donovan and was sentenced to less than 10 years in prison. Donovan was charged with felony murder and was sentenced to life without parole. Donovan (aged 33) in 2009 appealed against his sentence of life without parole for felony murder on the grounds that, although he punched Raustein, he had no knowledge of a knife or planned robbery. Raustein's family has said that "the life without parole sentence was way too harsh". The Massachusetts Supreme Judicial Court declined an appeal in 1996. In 2014, the Massachusetts Parole Board decided he should be released following six months in a rehabilitative program and one year in a lower level security prison.

References

External links 
MIT News Office
New York Times 19 Dec 07

1992 murders in the United States
Massachusetts Institute of Technology
1992 in Massachusetts
Deaths by stabbing in Massachusetts
Deaths by person in Massachusetts
History of Cambridge, Massachusetts
History of the Massachusetts Institute of Technology
September 1992 events in the United States